Alpine is a census-designated place (CDP) in the Cuyamaca Mountains of San Diego County, California. Alpine had a population of 14,696 at the 2020 census, up from 14,236 at the 2010 census. The town is largely surrounded by the Cleveland National Forest and borders two reservations of the Kumeyaay Nation, Viejas and Sycuan, and the rural unincorporated areas around the city of El Cajon.

History
Before its modern settlement, the area was part of the home of the Kumeyaay Indians, whose ancestors had lived here for possibly as long as 12,000 years.

The community's name was suggested by a resident in the 1880s who said that the environment reminded her of her native country of Switzerland.

The small commercial district along Alpine Boulevard has seen some suburban development in recent decades, and it is surrounded by large stretches of less densely populated rural areas that began in the late 19th and early 20th centuries. Horse ranches and small farms are still common, along with open chaparral hillsides and riparian canyons.

Geography

The location of Alpine is not precisely defined since it is an unincorporated area. According to the United States Geological Survey, it is at  (32.8350521, -116.7664109), which is near the intersection of Alpine Boulevard and Tavern Road. That is approximately where most maps place Alpine. Kumeyaay tribes are indigenous to the area, and the Ewiiaapaayp Band and Viejas Band of Kumeyaay Indians both have headquarters in Alpine.

Climate
According to the Köppen Climate Classification system, Alpine has a warm-summer Mediterranean climate, abbreviated "Csa" on climate maps. Summers are warm and dry, and winters are cool with moderate precipitation. Temperatures are more extreme than coastal San Diego, similar to nearby El Cajon and Ramona, and less extreme than the nearby mountain and desert regions, such as  Julian.

Rainfall amounts can vary greatly from month to month, or from year to year.

Average January temperatures range from the low 60s in the day to the low 40s at night. Average July temperatures range from upper 80s to the low 90s in the day to the low 60s at night.

Snowfall is very rare within the town of Alpine, with trace amounts falling once out of every two to three winters. However, light snow commonly falls each winter at elevations above .

Demographics

2010
At the 2010 census Alpine had a population of 14,236. The racial makeup of Alpine was 12,424 (87.3%) White, 167 (1.2%) African American, 222 (1.6%) Native American, 319 (2.2%) Asian, 39 (0.3%) Pacific Islander, 576 (4.0%) from other races, and 489 (3.4%) from two or more races. Hispanic or Latino of any race were 2,081 persons (14.6%).

The census reported that 14,098 people (99.0% of the population) lived in households, 136 (1.0%) lived in non-institutionalized group quarters, and 2 (0%) were institutionalized.

There were 5,248 households, 1,932 (36.8%) had children under the age of 18 living in them, 3,120 (59.5%) were opposite-sex married couples living together, 515 (9.8%) had a female householder with no husband present, 268 (5.1%) had a male householder with no wife present.  There were 283 (5.4%) unmarried opposite-sex partnerships, and 39 (0.7%) same-sex married couples or partnerships. 1,048 households (20.0%) were one person and 433 (8.3%) had someone living alone who was 65 or older. The average household size was 2.69.  There were 3,903 families (74.4% of households); the average family size was 3.09.

The age distribution was 3,403 people (23.9%) under the age of 18, 1,164 people (8.2%) aged 18 to 24, 3,133 people (22.0%) aged 25 to 44, 4,583 people (32.2%) aged 45 to 64, and 1,953 people (13.7%) who were 65 or older.  The median age was 41.9 years. For every 100 females, there were 97.8 males.  For every 100 females age 18 and over, there were 94.6 males.

There were 5,536 housing units at an average density of 206.7 per square mile, of the occupied units 3,597 (68.5%) were owner-occupied and 1,651 (31.5%) were rented. The homeowner vacancy rate was 2.0%; the rental vacancy rate was 6.3%.  9,935 people (69.8% of the population) lived in owner-occupied housing units and 4,163 people (29.2%) lived in rental housing units.

2000
At the 2000 census there were 13,143 people, 4,775 households, and 3,652 families in the CDP. The population density was 489.1 inhabitants per square mile (188.9/km). The racial makeup of the CDP was 90.8% White, 0.8% African American, 1.2% Native American, 2.0% Asian, 0.2% Pacific Islander, 2.9% from other races, and 2.2% from two or more races.  10.2% of the population were Hispanic (U.S. Census) or Latino of any race.
Of the 4,775 households 36.5% had children under the age of 18 living with them, 63.5% were married couples living together, 8.5% had a female householder with no husband present, and 23.5% were non-families. 17.3% of households were one person and 7.0% were one person aged 65 or older.  The average household size was 2.72 and the average family size was 3.06.

The age distribution was 26.0% under the age of 18, 7.0% from 18 to 24, 29.3% from 25 to 44, 26.6% from 45 to 64, and 11.1% 65 or older.  The median age was 38 years. For every 100 females, there were 99.9 males.  For every 100 females age 18 and over, there were 97.6 males.

The median household income was $61,832 and the median family income  was $69,821. Males had a median income of $51,444 versus $31,891 for females. The per capita income for the CDP was $29,523.  About 4.9% of families and 6.6% of the population were below the poverty line, including 9.6% of those under age 18 and 4.3% of those age 65 or over.

Education
Alpine is home to the Alpine Union School District, which manages Joan MacQueen Middle School, Boulder Oaks Elementary School, Shadow Hills Elementary School, and Creekside Early Learning Center.

Government

Notable people

Being as an Ocean, melodic hardcore band
Sheldon Creed, off-road racing driver and NASCAR driver
Marcus Giles, former Major League Baseball second baseman
Mark Grant, former Major League Baseball pitcher and San Diego Padres announcer
Duncan D. Hunter,  former United States Representative
Duncan L. Hunter,  former United States Representative
Alex Vesia, current Major League Baseball pitcher for the Los Angeles Dodgers.
Cole Whitt, NASCAR driver

References

External links

 Alpine Mountain Empire Chamber of Commerce
 The Alpine Sun - local newspaper

Census-designated places in San Diego County, California
Cuyamaca Mountains
East County (San Diego County)
Census-designated places in California